Argyria subtilis is a moth in the family Crambidae. It was described by Cajetan Felder, Rudolf Felder and Alois Friedrich Rogenhofer in 1875. It is found in Colombia.

References

Argyriini
Moths described in 1875
Moths of South America